The 2020 Houston Roughnecks season was the first season for the Houston Roughnecks as a professional American football franchise. They played as charter members of the XFL, one of eight teams to compete in the league for the 2020 season. The Roughnecks played their home games at TDECU Stadium and were led by head coach June Jones.

Their inaugural season was cut short due to the COVID-19 pandemic and the XFL officially suspended operations for the remainder of the season on March 20, 2020.

Standings

Schedule
All times Central

Final roster

Staff

Game summaries

Week 1: vs. Los Angeles Wildcats

The Roughnecks were the only Western Conference team to win in week 1 as they started their season 1–0.

Week 2: vs. St. Louis BattleHawks

Week 3: at Tampa Bay Vipers

Week 4: at Dallas Renegades

Week 5: Seattle Dragons

With the win, the Roughnecks finished their season 5–0.  The remainder of their games were canceled due to the COVID-19 pandemic.

References

Houston
Houston Roughnecks
Houston Roughnecks